Camille Dory Chamoun (1957 -) is a Lebanese politician. In 2022 he won a seat in Lebanon’s parliament. In April 2021 he was elected head of the National Liberal Party.

Early life 
Chamoun was born into a prominent Maronite political family in the town of Deir el Qamar in the Chouf district. His father is the former president of the NLP, Dory Chamoun.

He joined the Free Tigers militia, the military wing of the National Liberal Party, and participated in the battles of the first phase of the civil war before traveling to London to complete his studies.

References

21st-century Lebanese politicians

Living people

Lebanese Maronites
1957 births
National Liberal Party (Lebanon) politicians
Chamoun family